Gulf of Hammamet is a large gulf in northeastern Tunisia.

Geography
The Gulf of Hammamet is located south of the Cape Bon peninsula. To the other side of the Cape Bon peninsula is the Gulf of Tunis.

Hammamet, a popular vacation resort city, lies at the northwestern edge of the gulf.

References

Hammamet
Hammamet